Périgné is a commune in the Deux-Sèvres department in western France. The writer and film critic Pascal Mérigeau was born in Périgné.

See also
Communes of the Deux-Sèvres department

References

Communes of Deux-Sèvres